Ciaculli is an outlying suburb of Palermo, Sicily, Italy. It counts less than 9500 residents. Ciaculli is close to the suburb of Croceverde. Ciaculli has been important within the history of the Cosa Nostra. The best known Mafia family is the Greco Mafia clan.  Ciaculli was the location of the Ciaculli Massacre, in which several police and military officers were killed by a bomb intended for Salvatore Greco "Ciaschiteddu".

External links
Italian site on the Ciaculli Agricultural Park

Zones of Palermo
Greco Mafia clan